Wang Wei (born 22 June 1989) is a Chinese footballer who currently plays as a versatile midfielder or full back for Chinese Super League team Meizhou Hakka.

Club career
Wang Wei started his professional football career in 2009 when he was promoted to China League Two side Beijing Baxy's first team squad. He transferred to China League One side Qingdao Jonoon in February 2014 after a successful trial. On 16 March 2014, he made his debut in a 1–1 home draw with Xinjiang Tianshan Leopard. He scored his first goal for the club on 29 March 2014 in a 1–1 home draw against Shenyang Zhongze. Wang was a regular starter of the club, playing 85 league matches of 90 from 2014 to 2016 and scoring 13 goals.

On 28 February 2017, Wang transferred to Chinese Super League side Shanghai Greenland Shenhua following Qingdao Jonoon's relegation. He made his debut on 3 April 2018 in the fifth group stage match of 2018 AFC Champions League against Kashima Antlers with a 2–2 home draw. He made his Super League debut five days later on 8 April, in a 2–0 away win over Beijing Renhe. He scored his first goal for the club on 20 May 2018 in a 2–1 away defeat to Tianjin Quanjian. On 28 February 2020 he joined newly promoted Qingdao Huanghai on loan for the start of the 2020 Chinese Super League.

On 22 March 2022, Wang transferred to Chinese Super League club Meizhou Hakka. He would go on to make his debut in a league game on 4 June 2022 against Tianjin Jinmen Tiger in a 1-1 draw.

Career statistics
.

Honours

Club
Shanghai Shenhua
Chinese FA Cup: 2019

References

External links
 

1989 births
Living people
Chinese footballers
Footballers from Dalian
Beijing Sport University F.C. players
Qingdao Hainiu F.C. (1990) players
Shanghai Shenhua F.C. players
Qingdao F.C. players
Meizhou Hakka F.C. players
China League Two players
China League One players
Chinese Super League players
Association football midfielders
People from Wafangdian
21st-century Chinese people